In mathematics, specifically category theory, an essential monomorphism is a monomorphism f in a category C such that for a morphism g in C, the morphism  is a monomorphism only when g is a monomorphism. Essential monomorphisms in a category of modules are those whose image is an essential submodule of the codomain. An injective hull of an object X is an essential monomorphism from X to an injective object.

References

Category theory